Niulanshan No.1 High School or Beijing Shunyi Niulanshan First Secondary School is a public 10th through 12th grade senior high school in Niulanshan Town (牛栏山镇), Shunyi District, Beijing. Niulanshan's  Campus includes boarding facilities. As of 2015 the school has 2,700 students and 215 full-time faculty.

It was founded in 1950. In 2002 it was designated as a "model high school".
The recent headmaster of this school is Huali Zhang()

References

External links

 Niulanshan No.1 High School
 Niulanshan No.1 High School 
 School profile in Chinese

High schools in Beijing
Schools in Shunyi District